Polyhymno is a genus of moths in the family Gelechiidae.

Species
Some species of this genus are:

Polyhymno abaiella Amsel 1974
Polyhymno acaciella Busck 1900
Polyhymno alcimacha Meyrick 1918
Polyhymno blastophora Janse, 1950
Polyhymno cemiostomella Zeller 1877
Polyhymno centrophora (Meyrick, 1921)
Polyhymno charigramma Meyrick 1929
Polyhymno chionarcha Meyrick, 1913
Polyhymno cleodorella Walsingham, 1891
Polyhymno colleta Walsingham 1911
Polyhymno colorata Legrand, 1966
Polyhymno conflicta Meyrick 1917
Polyhymno convergens Walsingham 1911
Polyhymno crambinella Zeller 1877
Polyhymno deuteraula Meyrick, 1914
Polyhymno erratica Janse, 1950
Polyhymno eurydoxa Meyrick, 1909
Polyhymno exalbida Omelko, 2011
Polyhymno furcatella Janse, 1950
Polyhymno fuscobasis (Omelko, 1993)
Polyhymno gladiata Meyrick 1917
Polyhymno hieracitis Meyrick, 1913
Polyhymno hostilis Meyrick, 1918
Polyhymno inermis Meyrick, 1913
Polyhymno intorta Meyrick, 1918
Polyhymno intortoides Janse, 1950
Polyhymno leucocras Walsingham 1911
Polyhymno lignicolor Janse, 1950
Polyhymno luteostrigella Chambers, 1874
Polyhymno millotiella Viette, 1954
Polyhymno multifida Meyrick, 1917
Polyhymno oxystola Meyrick, 1913
Polyhymno palinorsa Meyrick, 1909
Polyhymno paracma Meyrick, 1909
Polyhymno paraintortoides Bidzilya & Mey, 2011
Polyhymno pausimacha Meyrick, 1909
Polyhymno pernitida Janse, 1950
Polyhymno pleuracma Meyrick, 1926
Polyhymno subaequalis Walsingham 1911
Polyhymno tetragrapha Meyrick, 1913
Polyhymno thinoclasta Meyrick, 1926
Polyhymno tropaea Meyrick, 1908
Polyhymno walsinghami Janse, 1950

Former species
Polyhymno attenuata (Omelko, 1993)
Polyhymno celata (Omelko, 1993)
Polyhymno corylella (Omelko, 1993)
Polyhymno fusca (Omelko, 1993)
Polyhymno indistincta (Omelko, 1993)
Polyhymno obliquata (Matsumura, 1931)
Polyhymno pontifera (Meyrick, 1934)
Polyhymno sexstrigella Chambers 1874 
Polyhymno subocellea (Stephens, 1834)
Polyhymno trapezoidella (Caradja, 1920)
Polyhymno trichoma (Caradja, 1920)

References

External links

Encyclopedia of Life
afromoths

 
Thiotrichinae